Charles T. Courtney Jr. (July 23, 1930 – January 20, 2000) was an American actor and stuntman perhaps best known for his portrayal of Dan Reid Jr., the Lone Ranger's nephew, in the television version of The Lone Ranger.

Courtney's mother, Elizabeth Courtney, was a costume designer at Columbia.

Courtney first played Reid in The Lone Ranger in 1950. Between then and 1955, he made 13 more appearances in that role. He appeared in films and television series' such as The Virginian, Pet Sematary, The Wild Wild West, Rio Lobo, Wagon Train, The Cowboys, Billy the Kid Versus Dracula and Star Trek.

On January 20, 2000, Courtney died at his home as the result of a self-inflicted gunshot wound.

References

External links

1930 births
2000 deaths
American stunt performers
American male television actors
American male film actors
Male actors from Los Angeles
Male Western (genre) film actors
20th-century American male actors
Suicides by firearm in California
2000 suicides